Bucking the Line is a 1921 American silent drama film directed by Carl Harbaugh and starring Maurice 'Lefty' Flynn, Molly Malone and Kathryn McGuire.

Cast
 Maurice 'Lefty' Flynn as John Montague Smith 
 Molly Malone as Corona Baldwin
 Norman Selby as 	Jerry
 Edwin B. Tilton as 	Colonel Dexter Baldwin
 Kathryn McGuire as 	Vera Richlander
 J. Farrell MacDonald as 	Dave Kinsey
 Jim Farley as 	Watrous Dunham 
 Leslie Casey as Tucker Jibbey
 George Kerby as 	Rand Barlow

References

Bibliography
 Connelly, Robert B. The Silents: Silent Feature Films, 1910-36, Volume 40, Issue 2. December Press, 1998.
 Munden, Kenneth White. The American Film Institute Catalog of Motion Pictures Produced in the United States, Part 1. University of California Press, 1997.

External links
 

1921 films
1921 drama films
1920s English-language films
American silent feature films
Silent American drama films
American black-and-white films
Films directed by Carl Harbaugh
Fox Film films
1920s American films